Jang Hye-jin (born September 5, 1975) is a South Korean actress. She is best known internationally for her role as Kim Chung-sook in the Academy Award winning film Parasite.

Career 
Hye-jin was born in Busan on September 5, 1975. Her acting career began in the 1990s, with a minor role in the 1998 feature film If It Snows On Christmas. She began to gain media attention in her native country in the mid-2000s when she played the role of Park Myung-suk in the dramatic film Secret Sunshine under the direction of filmmaker and novelist Lee Chang-dong and with her appearance in SBS's My Sweet Seoul TV series.

At the end of the decade she appeared in the films Marine Boy by Yoon Jong-seok and Poetry by the aforementioned Lee Chang-dong. In 2016 she was cast in Yoon Ga-eun's The World of Us and Shin Joon's Yongsoon, before playing Jung-hee in Lee Dong-eun's feature film Mothers with Im Soo-jung, Yoon Chan-young and Lee Sang-hee.

After playing supporting roles in the films Adulthood and Youngju and in the TV series Hold me Tight, the actress gained international recognition by playing the lead role of Kim Chung-sook in Bong Joon-ho's award-winning film Parasite, which won four Academy Awards in 2020 in the categories of Best Film, Best Director, Best Original Screenplay, and Best International Film. In the movie she plays a mother who irregularly gets the job as a housekeeper for a wealthy family.

After her participation in Parasite, the actress was featured in the 2020 TV series A Piece of Your Mind, How to Buy a Friend, True Beauty and Birthcare Center, in addition to playing the role of Seon-myeong in the comic feature film More Than Family alongside Krystal Jung and Choi Deok-moon.

In 2021, she played the role of Court Lady Seo in MBC historical drama The Red Sleeve. And in 2022 she stars in JTBC television series Green Mothers' Club

Filmography

Film

Television series

Awards and nominations

References

External links
 

1975 births
Living people
South Korean television actresses
South Korean film actresses
South Korean stage actresses
Actresses from Busan
Korea National University of Arts alumni
Outstanding Performance by a Cast in a Motion Picture Screen Actors Guild Award winners